Lazım Esmaeili (also "Lazem") (1945–28 January 1996) was a Kurdish Iranian political activist operating in Turkey, who was found tortured and shot dead by unknown agents of Turkey's [MIT] Organization and [Iran's Intelligence and Security] in Istanbul.

Background
Esmaelli was born 1945 in Urmia (West Azarbaijan province) in Iran as a son of Selim.

He moved to Turkey and received a work permit from the Ministry of Interior's General Directorate of Security for the period between May 20, 1991 and September 20, 1992. As of September 1991, he was the partner of the Beyazıt Foreign Trade Co. in Istanbul, where he worked as director. On September 11, 1993, he received a residence permit valid for two years.

Death
On January 15, 1996, he and his friend Askar Simitko were abducted when they left the casino of Polat Renaissance Hotel in Yeşilköy, Istanbul at local time 03:45 or 03:30 am. On January 28th, 1996 villagers found the corpses of the two in Kerev Creek, Silivri, about  far from Istanbul. They were tortured, ears cut and shot multiple times.

See also
List of kidnappings
List of unsolved murders
List of solved missing person cases

References

External links
  (contains the Susurluk reports in English)

1995 deaths
1945 births
1990s missing person cases
Assassinated Iranian people
Assassinated spies
Deaths by firearm in Turkey
Formerly missing people
Iranian people murdered abroad
Iranian spies
Kidnapped people
Male murder victims
Missing person cases in Turkey
People from Urmia
People murdered in Turkey
Susurluk scandal
Unsolved murders in Turkey